KRG Studios is a film production and distribution company based in Bangalore. It primarily deals in distribution of Kannada-language films across Karnataka.

Background 
KRG Studios was established by Karthik Gowda, Executive Producer of Hombale Films in June 2017 and has been distributing films across Karnataka. Around September 2017, Karthik Gowda joined hands with film director Yogi G Raj. In the year 2020, KRG Studios reported another endeavour, KRG Connects (Movie Marketing Unit).

Furthermore, ventured into movie production with Rathnan Prapancha, a film starring Dhananjay and directed by Rohit Padaki.

Films Distributed

References 

Indian film distributors
Film production companies of India